Woman Without a Past (French: Femme sans passé) is a 1948 French comedy film directed by Gilles Grangier and starring François Périer, Sophie Desmarets and Alfred Adam.

The film's sets were designed by the art director Raymond Druart.

Cast
 François Périer as Michel
 Sophie Desmarets as Caroline
 Alfred Adam as Pierre Lorin
 Abel Jacquin as Demaison
 Margo Lion as Mlle Marcelle 
 Hélène Pépée as La folle
 Maurice Teynac as Chimerowitz
 René Stern as Le majordome
 Sylvain as Le domestique

References

Bibliography 
 Bessy, Maurice & Chirat, Raymond. ''Histoire du cinéma français: encyclopédie des films, 1940–1950. Pygmalion, 1986

External links 
 

1948 films
1948 comedy films
French comedy films
1940s French-language films
French black-and-white films
Films directed by Gilles Grangier
1940s French films

fr:Femme sans passé